Seweryn Chomet, FInstP (6 May 1930 in Drohobycz, Poland – 24 July 2009 in London, England) was a physicist, author, journalist, historian, publisher, prolific translator of Russian scientific journals into English, and former visiting research fellow of King's College London. He was a colleague and friend of such famous scientists as the physicists John Randall and Maurice Wilkins; he had just finished the book he had been writing for the last few years, Dr. Groer and The General's Hat, about the history of Poland and the discovery of E. coli, when he died at his home in Chelsea, London, where he lived for many years in later life, on 24 July 2009 after battling what his doctors said, shortly before he died, was motor neurons disease, for about a year. He had previously been married to Dr. Jane Chomet, née Janina (Jane) Rosita Friedman (Lwow, Poland, 10 March 1934 – 19 February 1994; married 1957 [marriage dissolved 1972]). He is buried in a Jewish cemetery, run by the United Synagogue, in Bushey, on the outskirts of North West London.

For the last 35 years and more of his life, he formed a partnership and marriage with Christine, his second wife and stepmother to his two sons and one daughter, Julian, William and Ann.

Birth and education

He often spoke with great pride about the beauty and architectural splendour of Drohobycz but retained bitter memories of the anti-Semitism that was prevalent in Poland at that time. When the war started, he was left with a friend of his mother as his parents were forcibly taken by the Russians to serve as doctors in the army. It was through this friend's immense act of kindness and bravery that he was able to hide for most of the war and survive the horrors that enveloped Poland during the 1940s.  After the war he escaped to England, where he was soon joined by his parents who set up a medical practice in Stamford Hill in North London.

While in his mid teens, they sent him to a "yeshiva", a Jewish seminary, run by an orthodox Jewish movement known as the "Lubavitch".  But soon after he ran away, with the intention of becoming a tailor, never to return. His father tracked him down and made sure he got down to some serious studying which eventually took him to study physics at what was then known as Regent Street Polytechnic. From there he went to do research at what would become his intellectual home for most of his life: King's College London. His intellectual excellence was recognised early on with the offer of a lectureship while still a postgraduate. He became a passionate and dedicated teacher and mentor to many science students during his 40-year tenure. Many of his former pupils remember him as someone who could make a physics lecture fun and entertaining.

Academic career

While a postgraduate student he had been witness to the behind-the-scenes events of one of the greatest scientific adventures of modern time. Maurice Wilkins was the leader of the King's biophysics team whose work made a major contribution to the discovery of the structure of DNA which ultimately became the bedrock of all modern genetics, including the mapping of the human genome. Wilkins shared a Nobel prize for his efforts and subsequently formed a mutually respectful relationship with Chomet, whose continuous prompting led Wilkins to write an autobiography and give his version of arguably the most important scientific discovery of the last 100 years.

He was appointed demonstrator in Physics at King's in 1956, lecturer in 1963; he subsequently retired in 1987, returning part-time as a visiting lecturer. He was justifiably proud to be associated with King's DNA 'legends' and in the 1993 organised a highly successful 40th anniversary commemoration of the 1953 discovery and subsequently published a sought after book of the proceedings. Anyone who went to King's had his seal of approval; he was fiercely proud of his students, of fellow scientists, doctors, graduates, academics, and alumni from King's. He would always be able to come up with an expert who was either down the corridor or preferably a former pupil of his who had gone on to excel in their chosen field to answer to a question

Away from his dedication to teaching science, he translated numerous cutting edge scientific research papers and text books from Russian into English both during and after the height of the cold war, but he had never formally studied Russian as a language.

He was very supportive of Russian scientists who were trying to work in the West. He was really a true polymath: a physicist, author, journalist, historian, publisher. When he was not teaching students he was writing articles for The Times on all sorts of science subjects or writing restaurant reviews for New Law Journal. He also probably held the world record for the greatest number of letters published in The Times newspaper on all sorts of subjects, he had maybe 101 published.

With Christine, his partner who would later become his wife, he even found time to stage conferences for audiences as diverse as funeral directors and dentists, and publish several niche books such as Why Is British Architecture So Lousy? For someone who rarely had a drink and could not play a musical instrument, he was an expert on wine and classical music.

He was a frequent contributor to Physics World magazine and his obituary subsequently appeared in "Interactions", the monthly newsletter to members of the Institute of Physics.

Post academic career

On retiring from lecturing at King's, he turned his intellectual rigour from physics to history. What followed was an acclaimed biography of one of Queen Victoria's daughters,
Princess Helena. His detailed research led to a unique collection of Royal material which led to an audience with the Queen, and some photographs of them in discussion; the book was called Helena, A Princess Reclaimed.

Soon after was another hugely forensic literary effort as he uncovered the secrets of how a Frenchman conned his way into 19th-century royal circles by pretending to be a count. When his consultant recently told him he had a serious illness, Chomet's main concern was whether he would have time to finish writing his current book, fortunately he managed it.

Although he was not an overtly religious man, he had a huge respect for the traditions for Judaism, his roots and the huge pain and sacrifices of his ancestors. In 1990, he wrote and published a book entitled Outrage at Auschwitz. The introduction was written by Immanuel Jakobovits, who at the time was the chief rabbi of British Jewry. That book and its message had a significant impact. It restated the sanctity of Auschwitz as a Jewish cemetery, a holy place that must not be desecrated. He was completely adamant about this and drew on the expert knowledge of religious scholars, both Jews and others, to explore why a Carmelite convent had chosen to build on the site of Auschwitz. His book, also supported by Sir Sigmund Sternberg, a notable figure in British, Jewish and European society, helped build a case to persuade Pope John Paul II, the "Polish Pope", to have the convent removed from Auschwitz. It also helped secure an apology from the Pope for the anti-semitism meted out by the Catholic Church to Jews over centuries.

The motivation for writing the book may have been a school friend of his who probably perished at Auschwitz. He was committed to ensuring that the sanctity of this place where his friend and the hundreds of thousands of others were murdered would remain intact. Auschwitz was also a Polish town. Its real name, before the Nazis took it over, was actually "Oszienchem". He also did other mitzvahs, good deeds, of which we know very very little about. He often went about it in his own quiet way on a grand scale and sometimes on a smaller scale too.

Another of his personality traits was his intellectual sense of humour which had a rather unusual range. He was once overheard at a dinner party sharing jokes about superstring theory with two of Britain's top scientists, jokes that probably only a handful of people could understand, let alone laugh at.

Books by Seweryn Chomet or with co-authors
D.N.A. Genesis of a Discovery (Ed.), Newman- Hemisphere Press 1994, London
Count de Mauny – Friend of Royalty, Newman-Hemisphere Press, London
Helena: A Princess Reclaimed, Begell House, New York, 1999 
 Outrage at Auschwitz, Newman-Hemisphere Press, London 1990

        / 1873106009
 / 9781873106006	

 Applications of Group Theory in Quantum Mechanicsby Mariia Ivanovna Petrashen, Eugenii Dmitreivich Trifonov, Seweryn Chomet, J. L. Martin. Hardcover, I P C Science & Technology Press, Limited, 
 Industrial Relations Bill: A Basis for Agreement?by Seweryn Chomet. Softcover, Newman Communications Ltd, 
 Nuclear Physicsby Konstantin Nikiforovich Mukhin, D. A. Smith, Seweryn Chomet. Hardcover, MacDonald & Company (Publishers), Limited, 
 Solid State Electronicsby Gérard Fournet, Seweryn Chomet. Hardcover, I P C Science & Technology Press, Limited, 
 Theory of Luminescenceby Boris Ivanovich Stepanov, Viktor Pavlovich Gribkovskii, Seweryn Chomet. Hardcover, I P C Science & Technology Press, Limited,

Books featuring Seweryn Chomet
 A Physicist Remembers by Richard J. Weiss. World Scientific Publishing

External links
 
Newman-Hemisphere web site
Jane Chomet obituary
DNA The King's story
King's College London website
King's College London Libraries
King's College London 175th Anniversary website

References

1930 births
2009 deaths
Academics of King's College London
Fellows of King's College London
Fellows of the Institute of Physics
Jewish scientists
English scientists
English physicists